Edna McGriff (December 16, 1935 – March 1980) was an American rhythm and blues singer and pianist. She recorded mainly in the 1950s, and secured one hit single on the US Billboard R&B chart with "Heavenly Father" in 1952. The record sold over 500,000 copies.

Life and career
Edna McGriff was born in Tampa, Hillsborough County, Florida, United States.  She was educated at Washington Irving High School in New York. She released her first single, "Note Droppin' Papa" / "Come Back", on Jubilee Records in September 1951 with Bennie Green's band.  Her second recording took place late that same year, when she sang with Buddy Lucas and His Band of Tomorrow on "Heavenly Father" / "I Love You". She was aged 16 at the time. The single was released in early 1952, and sales started to soar.  The track entered the US R&B chart in April 1952, peaking at No. 4 in a 13-week stay.  Various cover versions of "Heavenly Father" appeared, recorded by Fran Warren, The Four Lads, and also Evelyn Knight.

McGriff appeared on stage at the Earle Theater in Philadelphia.  Various shows followed, where she was placed on the bill with Alan Freed. Separately in June 1952, McGriff recorded six duets with Sonny Til of The Orioles, including "I Only Have Eyes for You", "Once in a While", "Picadilly" and "Good".

Her next solo release was "Pray For A Better World" / "In A Chapel by the Side of The Road", followed by "Edna's Blues" / "Why Oh Why" (1953).  Several other releases flopped and she moved to Josie Records, who issued "I'll Be Around" / "Ooh, Little Daddy" (1954), and then onto Favorite Records, but without any further chart activity.  Bell Records took up her contract, and issued "The Fool" / "Born to Be with You" (1956), and these were followed by many other cover versions, including Laurie London's "He's Got the Whole World in His Hands" and Huey "Piano" Smith's "Don't You Just Know It", however she had stopped recording with Bell by the time she was 22 years old. In 1958, she recorded a one-off single for Felsted, followed by another one-off for Savoy, this time duetting with longtime friend Buddy Lucas on "No Change" / "Ah-Ah-Ah".  Thereafter her career gradually wound down, with a small sprinkle of recordings spread over two record companies - Willow Records in 1961 (a remake of "Heavenly Father"), and Capitol during 1964-1965.

The Connecticut Marriage Index 1959-2001, reveals that at age 23 she married Leroy Minors in Stamford, Fairfield County, Connecticut, on March 7, 1959. The Social Security Death Index records that Edna Minors (née McGriff) died in Queens, New York, in March 1980, aged 44 years. Olivia Nelson said that her cause of death was due to lymphoma.

In August 2012, a compilation album of her recordings was issued by Bear Family Records.

Discography

Compilation album

See also
List of R&B musicians

References

External links
Discogs.com discography

1935 births
1980 deaths
American rhythm and blues singers
African-American pianists
Singers from New York (state)
People from Harlem
Musicians from Tampa, Florida
Date of death missing
20th-century American women pianists
20th-century American pianists
20th-century African-American women singers